Anton Pantov (born 25 March 1991) is a Kazakhstani biathlete. He was born in the Pavlodar Region. He competed at the Biathlon World Championships 2012, and at the 2014 Winter Olympics in Sochi, in sprint and individual.

References

1991 births
Living people
People from Pavlodar Region
Biathletes at the 2014 Winter Olympics
Kazakhstani male biathletes
Olympic biathletes of Kazakhstan
Asian Games medalists in biathlon
Asian Games silver medalists for Kazakhstan
Biathletes at the 2017 Asian Winter Games
Medalists at the 2017 Asian Winter Games
Universiade medalists in biathlon
Universiade silver medalists for Kazakhstan
Universiade bronze medalists for Kazakhstan
Competitors at the 2017 Winter Universiade
21st-century Kazakhstani people